Sebastián "Sebas" Montoya Freydell (born 11 April 2005) is a Colombian racing driver who is currently competing in the 2023 FIA Formula 3 Championship with Hitech Pulse-Eight. He previously competed for Prema Racing in the 2022 Formula Regional European Championship. He is the son of Formula One race winner Juan Pablo Montoya.

Career

Karting career 
Montoya started his competitive karting career in 2013, racing in the Rotax Micro Max class of the Florida Winter Tour when he was just eight years old. He proceeded to race in that series for the following four years, where he achieved a best result of fifth in 2016. Montoya then moved to Europe to compete in the CIK-FIA Karting European Championship in 2017. Montoya spent a total of three years in the European Karting scene, twice driving in the Karting World Championship and thrice in the European Championship. In his time in karts Montoya only won one championship at an international level; this being the Rok the Rio competition in 2018.

Formula 4

2020 
In 2020 Montoya made his single-seater debut with Prema Powerteam, racing full-time in the Italian F4 Championship and competing in two rounds of the ADAC F4 Championship. Unfortunately for Montoya, he was unable to score any podiums throughout the year, and finished eleventh in his main campaign, behind his three teammates Gabriele Minì, Dino Beganovic and Gabriel Bortoleto.

2021 

Montoya re-signed with Prema for the 2021 season, returning to the Italian and German F4 series. He would run a part-time campaign in the latter, finishing second thrice in the six races he competed in, putting him ninth in the standings, ahead of three full-time competitors. Montoya's Italian campaign would be just as fruitful: netting nine podiums but no wins, Montoya finished fourth at the end of the year, being narrowly beaten by teammate Kirill Smal due to a spin in safety car conditions at the final race of the season in Monza.

Formula Regional

2022 

At the start of 2022 Montoya made his debut in the Formula Regional Asian Championship with Mumbai Falcons India Racing. After scoring pole position for the first race, Montoya scored his first car racing win of his career in a lights-to-flag victory. Montoya took his second win during the third round at the Dubai Autodrome, also from pole position. He was ultimately unable to finish the season, but ended the championship in 7th place with 92 points.

Montoya moved up to the 2022 Formula Regional European Championship with Prema Racing. Montoya started his season strongly, taking two eighth places and a fourth place in the opening three races. Just before his weekend at Spa-Francorchamps, Montoya announced that he had started receiving backing and sponsorship from Red Bull, marking him as a Red Bull athlete. However, he failed to score a single point during the final eight races, and finished 13th in the standings with 44 points.

2023 
At the start of 2023, Montoya is set to do the full season in the 2023 Formula Regional Middle East Championship with Hitech Grand Prix. Montoya finished the season 21st in the standings, scoring only two points finishes.

FIA Formula 3 Championship

2022 
Due to Oliver Goethe's Euroformula Open commitments, Montoya replaced him and made his first F3 appearance in Zandvoort, driving for Campos Racing whilst Hunter Yeany recovered from a wrist injured. Following free practice in which he ended 17th, Montoya stated that "the car is a massive step" and "it's been quite good though." He qualified seventh as a red flag thwarted his rivals attempts to improve their lap times. Montoya finished both races in eighth place, being the only one in the Campos team to score points during the weekend. Montoya was ranked 21st in the final standings classification.

In late September, Montoya partook in the post-season test that year with Hitech Grand Prix at Jerez.

2023 
In January 2023, Montoya was announced as a Hitech Pulse-Eight driver for the 2023 FIA Formula 3 Championship.

Endurance racing

2022 

Montoya tested an endurance racing car for the first time during the 2021 FIA World Endurance Championship rookie test.

Montoya made his endurance debut during the 2022 IMSA SportsCar Championship, partaking in selected rounds for DragonSpeed Racing alongside his father. He was initially supposed to partake in the 2022 24 Hours of Daytona during late January, but was scrapped due to his clashing commitments in the Formula Regional Asian Championship.

2023 
Montoya is set to partake in the 2023 European Le Mans Series, driving for DragonSpeed USA in the LMP2 category alongside his father again.

Formula One 
At the start of 2023, Montoya was announced to be joining the Red Bull Junior Team.

Personal life 
Montoya's father is Juan Pablo Montoya, a seven-time Formula One Grand Prix winner and current IndyCar driver. He has two sisters, Paulina and Manuela.

Karting record

Karting career summary

Racing record

Racing career summary 

* Season still in progress.

Complete ADAC Formula 4 Championship results 
(key) (Races in bold indicate pole position) (Races in italics indicate fastest lap)

Complete Italian F4 Championship results 
(key) (Races in bold indicate pole position) (Races in italics indicate fastest lap)

Complete Formula Regional Asian Championship results 
(key) (Races in bold indicate pole position) (Races in italics indicate fastest lap)

Complete IMSA SportsCar Championship results 
(key) (Races in bold indicate pole position; results in italics indicate fastest lap)

Complete Formula Regional European Championship results 
(key) (Races in bold indicate pole position) (Races in italics indicate fastest lap)

Complete FIA Formula 3 Championship results 
(key) (Races in bold indicate pole position; races in italics indicate points for the fastest lap of top ten finishers)

Complete Formula Regional Middle East Championship results 
(key) (Races in bold indicate pole position) (Races in italics indicate fastest lap)

Complete European Le Mans Series results 
(key) (Races in bold indicate pole position; results in italics indicate fastest lap)

References

External links 
 

Colombian racing drivers
Italian F4 Championship drivers
ADAC Formula 4 drivers
Formula Regional European Championship drivers
Prema Powerteam drivers
Living people
2005 births
Formula Regional Asian Championship drivers
WeatherTech SportsCar Championship drivers
DragonSpeed drivers
Karting World Championship drivers
FIA Formula 3 Championship drivers
Campos Racing drivers
Racing drivers from Miami
Hitech Grand Prix drivers
Mumbai Falcons drivers
Formula Regional Middle East Championship drivers
European Le Mans Series drivers